Kevin Baron (19 July 1926 – 5 June 1971) was a professional footballer who played for Liverpool in the post-war years.

Life and playing career

Born at Preston, Lancashire, England, Baron played as an amateur for hometown club Preston before he was signed for Liverpool by George Kay in August 1945. He made his debut on 5 January 1946 in Liverpool's first competitive game after the conclusion of World War II; it was an FA Cup 3rd round 1st leg match at Sealand Road Chester, and was a debut to remember for Baron. Not only did the Reds beat Chester City 2–0, Baron made his debut alongside Liverpool legend Billy Liddell. Baron's first goal came on 8 November 1947 in a league match at Anfield. Grimsby Town were the visitors and Baron's 77th-minute strike secured the points in a 3–1 victory.

Baron did not break into the 1946–47 championship winning side, but played six times the following season.

Baron finally established himself as a first team regular in the 1949–50 season, the inside-forward only missed 4 of the 42 league games scoring 7 times, he also appeared in all 7 FA Cup ties scoring in the 3-1 4th round win over Exeter City at Anfield. The final was a mixture of emotions for Baron and the Reds, from being on a high for being part of the squad that took Liverpool to their first ever Wembley final to feeling the heartache of defeat after Arsenal won the match 2–0.

Baron's appearances took a downward turn during the 1950–51 season, but he won his spot back for the following campaign and only finished second to Liddell in the appearance chart, Liddell with 43 (40 league, 3 cup) and Baron with 41 (40 league, 1 cup). Kevin also chipped in with 6 goals.

He went on to appear another 44 times over the next 2 seasons, before leaving Liverpool in May 1954; he moved on to Southend. He later played for Northampton Town, before dropping into non-league football with Gravesend & Northfleet, Wisbech Town, Aldershot, Cambridge City, Bedford Town and Maldon Town.

He died in June 1971 at the age of 44.

Career details
 Liverpool F.C. (1945–1954) - 153 appearances, 32 goals - FA Cup runners-up medal (1950).

Family
Eighteen years after Kevin's death, his older brother Gerard was the oldest victim of the Hillsborough disaster on 15 April 1989, at age 67, when 94 Liverpool fans were crushed to death at the FA Cup semi-final (the death toll eventually reached 97).

External links
 

1926 births
1971 deaths
Footballers from Preston, Lancashire
English footballers
Preston North End F.C. players
Liverpool F.C. players
Southend United F.C. players
Northampton Town F.C. players
Ebbsfleet United F.C. players
Wisbech Town F.C. players
Aldershot F.C. players
Maldon & Tiptree F.C. players
Bedford Town F.C. players
Cambridge City F.C. players
English Football League players
Association football forwards
FA Cup Final players